Tauge goreng (Indonesian for "fried bean sprouts") is an Indonesian savoury vegetarian dish made of stir-fried tauge (bean sprouts) with slices of tofu, ketupat or lontong rice cake and yellow noodles, served in a spicy oncom-based sauce. Tauge goreng is a specialty of Jakarta and Bogor city, West Java, Indonesia. It is usually sold as street food using pikulan (carrying pole) or gerobak (cart) by street vendors. It is a popular street food in Indonesia, especially in Jakarta, and Greater Jakarta areas, including Bogor, Depok, Tangerang and Bekasi.

Ingredients
Tauge goreng is a vegetarian dish, because it contains no elements of animal-based ingredients. The main ingredient is the tauge or mung bean sprouts. Usually the bean sprout are cooked in front of customer using small and simple stove. The bean sprouts are not stir fried in cooking oil, but in small amount of boiling water instead. Then the slices of tofu, yellow noodles, and slices of ketupat or lontong rice cake are added, stir fried, mixed and heated together. Then the savoury and spicy oncom-based sauce is poured upon the cooked ingredients. The oncom-based sauce is made by stir-frying ground oncom in small amount of vegetable oil with spices, including ground galangal, salam leaf (Indonesian bayleaf), slices of tomato, scallion, garlic chives, tauco (fermented soybean paste), kecap manis (sweet soy sauce), key lime juice, and salt.

Oncom is bright orange-colored fermented crushed beans similar to tempeh, but made from different fungi. It is especially popular ingredient in Sundanese cuisine. The oncom-based sauce is also used in Bogor version of laksa, thus their taste are quite similar. The oncom-based sauce giving an earthy nutty flavour to the dish.

Variants

The most popular tauge goreng in Indonesia is the West Javan version, which uses oncom based sauce as mentioned above. However, there are numbers of stir fried beansprouts variants exist in the archipelago.

In Malaysia, there is a similar-named dish called taugeh goreng. However, this Malaysian version is a lot simpler, which only consists of beansprouts stir fried with chopped shallot, garlic and chili in soy sauce. This dish is a simple home cooking, and not sold as a street food in the country.

In Indonesia, this kind of simpler fried beansprout (without lontong rice cake, noodle, oncom and tauco sauce) is usually mixed with diced tofu instead, and it is called gehu, which is abbreviation of taoge and tahu or tumis tahu taoge. It is also a popular simple home cooking, and not a street food.

Another variant of stir fried beansprouts uses ikan asin (salted fish) or teri Medan (Medan's anchovy) to add savoury and salty flavour.

See also

 Laksa
 Ketoprak
 Gado-gado

References

External links
Taoge goreng recipe from Femina (in Indonesian)
Video of how to make Tauge Goreng from Youtube

Betawi cuisine
Sundanese cuisine
Vegetarian dishes of Indonesia
Street food in Indonesia